The Canton of Châteaugiron is a canton of France, in the Ille-et-Vilaine département, located in the northeast of the department. At the French canton reorganisation which came into effect in March 2015, the canton was expanded from 9 to 14 communes (5 of which merged into the new communes Châteaugiron and Piré-Chancé):

Boistrudan 
Châteaubourg
Châteaugiron
Domagné
Domloup
Louvigné-de-Bais
Noyal-sur-Vilaine
Piré-Chancé
Saint-Didier
Saint-Jean-sur-Vilaine
Servon-sur-Vilaine

References

Cantons of Ille-et-Vilaine